Koel is a Pakistani 1959 musical romantic drama film directed by Masood Parvez. 
The film stars Noor Jehan with Aslam Pervaiz, Neelo and Allauddin in supporting roles. 

This film is regarded as one of the best musical films of Lollywood with songs finely knitted in the plot. 

It received 4 Nigar Awards including Best Supporting Actress for Neelo and Best Playback Singer for Noor Jehan.

Cast 
 Noor Jehan
 Aslam Pervaiz
 Neelo
 Allauddin
 Nazar

Soundtrack

Awards and nominations

References

External links 

1959 films
Films scored by Khurshid Anwar
1959 musical films
Nigar Award winners
Pakistani musical films
1950s Urdu-language films
Urdu-language Pakistani films
Films directed by Masood Parvez